Wandering willy may refer to:

 William McDougall (politician, born 1822)
 Tradescantia a rambling plant